Events from the year 1723 in Canada.

Incumbents
French Monarch: Louis XV
British and Irish Monarch: George I

Governors
Governor General of New France: Philippe de Rigaud Vaudreuil
Colonial Governor of Louisiana: Jean-Baptiste Le Moyne de Bienville
Governor of Nova Scotia: John Doucett
Governor of Placentia: Samuel Gledhill

Births
 May 7 - Louis Dunière, politician (died 1806)
 July 19 - Jean-Marie Ducharme, fur trader (died 1807)

Deaths

Historical documents
Indigenous peoples previously unknown in New York come from as far away as Michilimackinac and Miami lands to trade

Five Nations (now Six with acceptance of Tuscarora) receive scores of "far Indians" from Michilimackinac to be seventh nation

Abenaki tell priest to "conquer" himself to learn their ways, as they did "to believe that which we do not see" (Note: "savage" used)

"Englishmen!" - Note left for enemy at Nanrantsouak assures them of Abenaki revenge that will not "end but with the world"

Massachusetts fights "wrangling war" with Indigenous people while supplying them "powder and shot[...], to murther ourselves"

Governors of Massachusetts and Canada exchange series of letters arguing which is right in New England's war with Abenaki

"Insolent letter" of governor of Canada warns Massachusetts that French will enter war unless "Bounds of the Indians Land" are settled

New York Council approves treaty whereby Five Nations will assist Massachusetts in war with "Eastern Indians"

Governor Dummer welcomes leaders of Haudenosaunee and other nations to Boston pursuant to their treaty with Massachusetts

New York governor says French risk losing influence with Five Nations who are helping Massachusetts fight French-allied "Algonkins"

"Those cruel Monsters" - Newspaper reports of Indigenous men attacking settlers at Northfield and Rutland

"Cagnowago" men "are very sorry and ashamed" for taking part in raid on Northfield, Massachusetts

"We shall generally observe that the politest Indians were farther remov'd from both the Poles" (Note: "brutal" and other racial stereotypes)

Naval timber of future New Brunswick cheaper than New England's, and Canso can become "most considerable[...]port in America"

Pirates have taken upwards of 20 French vessels near Île Royale, including 22-gun warship, and similar number on Grand Banks

With loss of Placentia, French government encourages Île-Royale (Cape Breton Island) with duty exemption on fish and fish oil

Quoting John Locke's essay on civil government, St. John's residents "embody ourselves into a community for[...]mutual preservation"

"Very great help to the trade" - Salmon fishery set up "on Great and Little Salmonier, Corret and Bisca Bay Rivers," Newfoundland

"Highly injur'd" - Merchants complain about overbearing Newfoundland garrison officers fishing and trading to foreign parts

Newfoundland survey answers include: more liquor sold on Sunday, and servants and New England merchants are paid in fish

Illustration: Highly imaginative depiction of Indigenous people carrying coffin in grand procession

References 

 
23
Canada